Luca Anthony Hoole (born 2 June 2002) is a Welsh professional footballer who plays as a  full-back or centre-back for Bristol Rovers and the Wales national under-21 football team.

Club career

Bristol Rovers
Hoole attended Ysgol Gyfun Gwynllyw, a Welsh language school in Pontypool. In 2014, Hoole joined the Bristol Rovers academy. In April 2018, Bristol Rovers confirmed Hoole had signed a scholarship with the club. On 3 September 2019, Hoole made his debut for Bristol Rovers in a 1–1 EFL Trophy draw against Plymouth Argyle.

Taunton Town (loan)
On 30 October 2020, Hoole joined Taunton Town on a one-month loan deal. Taunton played one match, a match that Hoole was not registered in time to feature in, before football was suspended on account of the lockdown measures brought in for COVID-19.

Breakthrough at Bristol Rovers
After impressing for the club in pre-season, Hoole made his league debut on the opening day of the 2021–22 season, impressing in the right-back position during a 2–1 away defeat to Mansfield Town. On 29 January 2022, Hoole received a first sending off of his career as he received two bookings in the space of five first-half minutes as ten-man Rovers scored a last-minute winner to defeat Walsall. In February 2022, Hoole signed a new two-year extension to his contract. Following a 4–0 thrashing of Stevenage, Rovers' manager Joey Barton said that Hoole had made the right-back position his own having dipped in and out of the team earlier in the season. On 26 February 2022, Hoole scored a first senior goal with the opener in a 1–1 draw with Exeter City. Hoole's first senior season ended with Rovers overtaking Northampton Town on the final day of the season to gain automatic promotion by goals scored, a dramatic 7–0 victory over Scunthorpe United securing this feat.

Ahead of the 2022–23 season, Hoole featured for the club in pre-season in a less familiar centre-back role, impressing as Rovers defeated Championship side Stoke City. For the first match of the new season, Hoole continued in this role with defensive partner James Connolly as Rovers fell to a late 2–1 defeat against Forest Green Rovers. As the season developed, he began to find himself out of favour at the club and suffered from low confidence, however an impressive return to the first-team in December leading manager Barton to claim that he could one day captain the side.

International career
On 13 November 2019, Hoole made his debut for Wales under-19's in a 3–0 win against Poland U19.

In May 2022, Hoole was called up to the Wales U21 team for the first time for the final 2023 U21 European Championship qualifiers against the Netherlands and Gibraltar. Hoole made his debut in the second of the two matches, coming off of the bench with fifteen minutes left as Wales finished their campaign with a 2–0 win.

Career statistics

References

2002 births
Living people
Association football defenders
Footballers from Newport, Wales
Welsh footballers
Wales youth international footballers
Wales under-21 international footballers
Bristol Rovers F.C. players
Taunton Town F.C. players
English Football League players